The Spotted Horse is an historic pub in Putney, in the London Borough of Wandsworth.

Location 
The pub is on the west side of Putney High Street at number 122.

History 
The pub opened in the 18th century and was one of Young's founding pubs.  It has an open fire and was remodelled in Edwardian period and in the early 2000s, with a piebald horse model over its entrance, but this is not seen in image of the pub in the 1920s.  In the 2010s a roof bar was added with further refurbishment, it was a finalist in the 2018 Casual Dining Awards for ‘Best Designed Pub/Bar of the year".

The pub is thought to have been a secret meeting place of Klaus Fuchs in the 1960s with his soviet handlers.

Management 
The pub is managed by Young & Co and used to have beer delivered from the Ram Brewery in Wandsworth by shire horse.

References

External links 
 The Spotted Horse website

Putney
Pubs in the London Borough of Wandsworth